Jin Haoxiang (born 14 June 1999) is a Chinese footballer currently playing as a defender for Zhejiang.

Club career
In 2018 Jin Haoxiang would be promoted to the senior team of Zhejiang and would make his debut on 25 August 2018 in a league game against Liaoning F.C. in a 2-2 draw. The following season he would be loaned out to third tier club Fujian Tianxin to gain more playing time. On his return, he would be used sparingly within the team as they renamed themselves Zhejiang Professional. He would be a squad player as the club gained promotion to the top tier at the end of the 2021 campaign. Once again, Jin would be loaned out to a third tier club in Hainan Star throughout the 2022 China League Two campaign.

Career statistics
.

References

External links
Haoxiang Jin at Worldfootball.net

1999 births
Living people
Chinese footballers
China youth international footballers
Association football defenders
China League One players
China League Two players
Zhejiang Professional F.C. players
Taizhou Yuanda F.C. players